Bredl is a German surname. Notable people with this surname include:

 Joshua Bredl (born 1991), real name of Bronson Matthews, American wrestler
 Michael Bredl (1915–1999), German musician and collector
 Peter Bredl (born 1951), Austrian rower
 Rob Bredl (born 1950), Australian documentary film-maker